The Tipping Point is the seventh studio album by the English pop rock band Tears for Fears, released on 25 February 2022 through Concord Records. It is the band's first studio album since Everybody Loves a Happy Ending, released almost 18 years prior.

Tracks on the album include "The Tipping Point", which was released with a music video in October 2021. Further singles followed, with "No Small Thing" released in December 2021, and "Break the Man" in January 2022. The album was a critical and commercial success, giving the band their sixth UK Top-5 album and highest chart peak in 30 years when it debuted at number 2 on the UK Album Chart (and actually topped the chart in the Scottish region). It also reached the Top 10 in numerous other countries including the US, Australia, France, Germany, Ireland, Switzerland, Belgium and The Netherlands. 

In the United States, the album debuted at number eight on the US Billboard 200 chart, earning 31,000 album-equivalent units (including 29,000 copies in pure traditional album sales, and 2,000  in streaming and song downloads) in its first week, according to MRC Data. This became the band's third US top-ten album on the chart and their first release to achieve this since their 1989 album The Seeds of Love. The album also accumulated a total of 2.04 million on-demand official streams from the set’s tracks.

Background
Work on the album began in 2013, but the process proved difficult for band members Roland Orzabal and Curt Smith. The band were asked by their (then) management company to collaborate with various younger artists in an attempt to create a more contemporary- and commercial-sounding album. However, these sessions (which the band themselves likened to "speed dating") were not entirely successful, resulting in an album which, as Orzabal later put it, sounded "less like a Tears For Fears album". The band originally signed to the Warner Music label to release the album, but once it was completed in 2016, Universal Music (who own the bulk of the band's back catalogue from the 1980s and 90s) then showed interest in the project. Universal opted to first release a new compilation album, Rule the World: The Greatest Hits, in 2017 in order to pave the way for the new album. This included two of the new tracks, including "I Love You but I'm Lost" which was co-written by the band along with members of Bastille. Earlier that year (on April 7), Orzabal uploaded a demo version of "Please Be Happy", sung by him (as opposed to Smith on the final release, which is also sped up so it is now a half-step higher), on SoundCloud. It was only later revealed that the lyrics were about his wife's struggles with depression, alcoholism and ensuing medical problems.

However, Universal then delayed releasing The Tipping Point as planned, at which point Orzabal and Smith began to have second thoughts about the finished product. The duo lost focus on the project for a while as Orzabal struggled with health problems following the death of his wife, and Smith even contemplated walking away from the band altogether. However, after a successful tour in 2019, they reconvened in early 2020 and "plotted a path forward of how we could finish an album that we were both happy with". The duo signed with a new management company, decided to rework the album (keeping some tracks and replacing others with new material), and then signed a new contract with Concord Records. Some lyrics were inspired by the death of Orzabal's wife in 2017. Of the various songs recorded with other artists and producers, many of the band's collaborations with Sacha Skarbek remained on the album. The track "Stay", which was the other new track to appear on the Rule the World compilation album in 2017, was also included in a slightly remixed form.

Promotion
"The Tipping Point" was released as the album's lead single on 7 October 2021. The music video for the track was directed by Matt Mahurin. The second single was "No Small Thing", released 3 December 2021, and accompanied by a collage music video directed by Vern Moen. The song was described as a restarting point after the band had been unhappy with the first version of the album, which was dominated by tracks that had been created with younger producers.
The third single, "Break the Man", was released on 13 January 2022. The song is about patriarchy and marks the first time Tears for Fears have released an original song as a single not written or co-written by Roland Orzabal. Smith had tweeted a snippet of the song in 2018, though the chorus lyric had originally been "kill the man" instead of "break the man". An animated video (directed by WeAreMonkeys, with animation by Mihai Wilson) was premiered on 10 February 2022. A music video for "My Demons" was released on 1 June 2022, directed by Heather Gildroy and featuring the dancer Ed Monroe. Earlier, Orzabal had joked that the song sounded as if it was written for Depeche Mode. On 18 August 2022 the band released a fifth single and video - this time for the song "Long, Long, Long Time". In an interview with RetroPop Magazine Curt Smith explained that the song is basically about how he and Roland learned to solve disagreements through honest and open dialogue. Once again Heather Gildroy directed the video, though this time with Justin Daashuur Hopkins.

Critical reception

The Tipping Point received an average score of 83 out of 100 based on 15 reviews according to Metacritic, indicating "universal acclaim".

Track listing

Note: The only release containing all three bonus tracks on one disc is the Super Deluxe Edition (SDE) CD edition, which was limited to 2000 units.
"Let It All Evolve" and "Shame (Cry Heaven)" are also available on vinyl, as a 7" that is part of the limited Target vinyl edition.

Steven Wilson mixed the album (without bonus tracks) to 5.1 surround and Dolby Atmos. The Atmos version was also released on streaming services, but the 5.1 is only available on the SDE blu-ray disc, again initially limited to 2000 units, but later re-pressed due to demand, the second pressing surpassing the first with 2500 manufactured units.

Note
  indicates an additional producer

Personnel 
Tears for Fears
 Roland Orzabal – vocals (lead on 1, 2, 5, 6, 8, 9, 11 & 12), keyboards, programming, guitars, mixing (5, 9)
 Curt Smith – vocals (lead on 2, 3, 4, 7, 10 & 13; backing on 1, 5 & 11), keyboards, bass guitars, mixing (5, 9)

Additional musicians
 Charlton Pettus – keyboards, programming, guitars, mixing (1, 3, 4, 6-8, 10, 11)
 Sacha Skarbek – acoustic piano (7), vocal production (3)
 Florian Reutter – programming, vocal production (3)
 Doug Petty – accordion, Hammond organ (1), acoustic piano (6), string arrangements (7)
 Max von Ameln – guitars (5)
 Aaron Sterling – drums (1, 4, 6)
 Jamie Wollam – drums (1)
 Carina Round – backing vocals (1, 3, 5, 6)
 Jason Joseph – vocal arrangements, choir (6)
 Charles Jones – choir (6)
 Jessi Collins – choir (6)
 Lauren Evans – choir (6)

Technical
 Ted Jensen – mastering (1–10)
 Justin Shturtz – mastering (11–13)
 Tim Palmer – mixing (2)
 Craig Silvey – mixing (12)
 Tony Maserati – mixing (13)
 Max von Ameln – engineering assistance
 Steven Wilson – surround mixing (Blu-Ray and Atmos streaming)

Artwork
 Tommy Steele – design, art direction
 Carrie Smith – art direction
 Cinta Vidal – cover art
 Frank Ockenfels 3 – photography

Charts

Weekly charts

Year-end charts

References

2022 albums
Tears for Fears albums